Bezverkhovo is a hamlet in Solnechnogorsky District of Moscow Oblast, Russia. Population: .

References

Rural localities in Moscow Oblast